Ranier Racing with MDM, formerly known as Ranier-Lundy, was an American professional stock car racing team that last competed in the NASCAR Camping World Truck Series, the K&N Pro Series East, and the ARCA Racing Series. The team formerly competed in the NASCAR Winston Cup Series racing team until 1987, fielding Cale Yarborough during the 1980s late in its operations. The team later became Robert Yates Racing after Yates, an engine builder and crew chief with the operation, bought the team in 1988. The team largely fielded General Motors vehicles for its various drivers until switching to Fords in 1985.

The team won the 1980 Daytona 500 with Buddy Baker and 1983 and 1984 Daytona 500 with Yarborough.

The team was based in Charlotte and co-operated by Harry Ranier (February 25, 1937July 21, 1999)  and J. T. Lundy. who left in 1987 Ranier was a Kentuckian coal mining magnate. Ranier's entry into the sport predates magnates such as J. D. Stacy and Billy Hagan.

Cup Series

Car No. 28 history

1967–1980
Harry Ranier started entering racecars into NASCAR's top division sporadically starting in 1967 and consistently starting in 1978 with driver Lennie Pond and later Buddy Baker.

In 1978, Ranier's team won its first race at the Talladega 500 with Pond after other key leading cars were slowed when Bill Elliott's car blew a tire and spreading debris.

Buddy Baker drove for the team starting in 1979. In 1980, Waddell Wilson was crew chief and engine builder. Baker won the 1980 Daytona 500 for the team in a famous paint scheme known as the "gray ghost". The car set the record for fastest Daytona 500 ever run by average speed, a record that still stands.

1983–1988

In 1983, Yarborough moved to the No. 28 Hardee's Chevrolet owned by Harry Ranier, competing in 16 events. He won four races, including his third Daytona 500, his sixth Atlanta Coca-Cola 500, and swept both events at Michigan, along with three poles. In 1984 he repeated by winning his fourth Daytona 500, becoming the second driver to score back-to-back wins, the Winston 500 at Talladega, a race that featured 75 lead changes, and the Van Scoy Diamond Mine 500, along with four poles.  In 1985 after his team switched to a Ford, he won his first Talladega 500 and scored his final win in the Miller High Life 500 at Charlotte Motor Speedway.

1987–1988
Prior to the 1987 season, car owner Ranier tapped Davey Allison to replace veteran driver Cale Yarborough in the Ranier-Lundy No. 28 Ford Thunderbird. Yarborough was leaving the Ranier-Lundy team to start his own operation along with the team's sponsor, Hardee's. Ranier negotiated a sponsorship deal with Texaco's Havoline motor oil brand, a deal that was signed during the Speedweeks at Daytona International Speedway. He also hired Robert Yates as his engine builder and Joey Knuckles as the No. 28's crew chief, who paired with Allison for years.

On qualifying day, Allison signalled that he was in Winston Cup to stay when he qualified an unmarked, but Texaco-Havoline painted No. 28 Thunderbird second for the 1987 Daytona 500, becoming the first rookie ever to start on the front row for NASCAR's most prestigious event.  A pit miscue which allowed a rear tire to fall off on the track ended his hopes of a good finish in the race, but success for Davey Allison would be just around the corner.

Allison drove full time in the Texaco/Havoline #28 for Ranier in 1987 and 1988. Ranier sold his team to Yates on October 1, 1988, prior to the 1989 season. Allison would have most of his success driving for Yates Racing. Ranier did not field a car again until the fall of 1996.

Car No. 20 history
After staying out of the Cup Series for eight years, Ranier fielded a Cup entry with Elton Sawyer driving the new #20 in the 1996 season finale at the Atlanta Motor Speedway.
Rainer back moved to Cup full time in 1997 with former partner Hardee's returning to sponsor the new #20 and Greg Sacks driving the car. However, after missing several early-season races, the team switched to part time, and eventually Hardee's left the team and it shut down.

Busch Series

Car No. 15 history
Ranier returned to run a limited schedule in the 1996 Busch Series with IRL star Tony Stewart driving the No. 15. The team had sponsorship from Mariah Entertainment for the first two events of a nine race schedule, running the rest unsponsored. Stewart had a best finish of 16th at Bristol. The Ranier Busch Series team shut down after the season.

Truck Series
For the operations after the 2016 season, see MDM Motorsports

Truck No. 71 history
On February 4, 2016, MDM-Hillman Racing joined Lorin Ranier to create a driver development team that would compete in, among other series, the  Camping World Truck Series. A selection of Richard Childress Racing development drivers were scheduled to run a partial season in the No. 99 Chevrolet, with funding from the drivers' other sponsors. After rain cancelled qualifying at Dover, the team made a deal to run Dover and the rest of Ranier/MDM's 2016 schedule in the No. 71 Chevrolet, leasing owners points from Carlos Contreras. Brandon Jones and Austin Dillon split the Truck for six races.

Truck No. 99 history
Ranier Racing/MDM was supposed to field the No. 99 in six Truck races in 2016, however the truck was renumbered to No. 71 after leasing owners points from Contreras Motorsports.

In 2017, the No. 99 truck returned but since Ranier and Miller parted ways the team starting in 2017 and beyond is called MDM Motorsports.

K&N Pro Series / ARCA Racing Series

In 2015, Ranier Racing with MDM partner with Hillman Racing to field two cars (No. 40 and No. 41) in both K&N Pro Series East and K&N Pro Series West.

The team returned for 2016.

In 2017, the team shut down because Ranier/Hillman and Miller part ways. Miller renamed the team to MDM Motorsports.

Austin Dillon, Landon Cassill, Ryan Preece, Kyle Benjamin, Travis Miller, Brian Wong, Corey LaJoie and Spencer Davis all drove for the team in K&N.

The team also fielded two part-time entries (the No. 8 and No. 28) in ARCA Racing Series' 2016 season, the team had 1 win with Brandon Jones at Michigan. The team also had 1 pole-position with Kyle Benjamin at Iowa.

Alongside Jones and Benjamin, Harrison Burton, Travis Miller, Matt Tifft and Michael Self also drove for the team in ARCA.

References

External links
 

Defunct NASCAR teams